Alenka Gerlovič (17 September 1919 – 9 December 2010) was a Slovene painter.

Gerlovič was born in Ljubljana in 1919. She studied art at the Zagreb Academy of Fine Arts. During the Second World War she joined the partisans. She died in Ljubljana in 2010.

She won the Levstik Award in 1968 for her book Likovni pouk otrok (Art Classes for Children).

She won the Prešeren Foundation Award in 1981 for her artistic achievements.

References

1919 births
2010 deaths
Artists from Ljubljana
Prešeren Award laureates
Levstik Award laureates
Academy of Fine Arts, University of Zagreb alumni
Yugoslav Partisans members
Slovenian women artists
20th-century Slovenian painters
20th-century women artists
Women in the Yugoslav Partisans
Yugoslav painters
Women painters